Edward A. Allworth was an American historian specializing in Central Asia. Allwarth is widely regarded as the West’s leading scholar on Central Asian studies. He extensively studied the various ethnic groups of the region, including Uzbeks, Tajiks, and Bukharan Jews. He wrote numerous books on the history of Central Asia.

Books by Allworth

References

Bibliographies by writer
Bibliographies of American writers